Nicholas IV Mouzalon, (c. 1070 – 1152) was the Patriarch of Constantinople from December 1147 to March/April 1151.

Nicholas was born in c. 1070, and probably began his career teaching the gospels. Emperor Alexios I Komnenos (r. 1081–1118) appointed him as archbishop of Cyprus, but Nicholas abdicated the see in c. 1110. He spent the next 37 years in the Monastery of Saints Cosmas and Damian in the Kosmidion suburb of Constantinople.

He was elected to the patriarchal throne in 1147, replacing Cosmas II, who was accused of Bogomilism. His election however caused considerable controversy: its canonical validity was called in question, since he had voluntarily resigned from his previous see. Eventually, Nicholas was forced to resign as patriarch, and died in 1152.

He wrote a number of theological works, amongst them a treatise refuting the Filioque addressed to Alexios I, and a vivid poetic defence of his first abdication.

Sources 
 

1070s births
1152 deaths
12th-century patriarchs of Constantinople
Archbishops of Cyprus
12th-century Byzantine writers
Mouzalon family
Officials of Manuel I Komnenos